The Time to Live and the Time to Die, also known as A Time to Live, A Time to Die is a 1985 Taiwanese film directed by Hou Hsiao-hsien. This film is inspired by screenwriter-turned-director Hou's own coming-of-age story.

This film is the second part of Hou's coming-of-age trilogy, preceded by A Summer at Grandpa's (1984) and followed by Dust in the Wind (1986).

Plot 
Spanning the years 1947–65, the film follows the maturation of Ah-ha (Ah-hsiao) as he and his family (parents, grandmother, older sister, three brothers) cope with the shock of leaving their homeland (the grandmother keeps talking about returning to the mainland to visit the ancestors). Having been only a child during the move, Ah-ha quickly acclimatizes himself to the new country, often putting him at odds with his more traditional family; he joins a street gang and has to choose between that life and taking the college entrance exam.

Cast 
 Chang Chia-bao
 Chang Neng
 Chen Chih-chen
 Chen Han-wen
 Chen Shu-fang 
 Chiang Bao-te
 Chou Tung-hung
 Hsiao Ai
 Hu Hsiang-ping
 Kao Tung-lai
 Lin Chung-wen
 Liu Kuo-bao
 Lo Cheng-ye
 Lo Shun-lin
 Lo Tse-chung

Awards 
 1986 Berlin International Film Festival Forum of New Cinema
 Won: FIPRESCI Prize
 1987 Rotterdam International Film Festival
 Won: Rotterdam Award – Best Non-American/Non-European Film
 1990 Kinema Junpo Awards
 Won: Best Foreign Language Film Director – Hou Hsiao-hsien

Reception 
Review aggregator Rotten Tomatoes reports 100% approval for The Time to Live and the Time to Die, based on five reviews with an average rating of 8.2/10. Janet Maslin of The New York Times praised its cinematography and wrote that "much of the film is about suffering and loss, detailing the painful circumstances in which family members, one by one, grow ill and die. The simplicity and tact with which these illnesses are chronicled help to give an otherwise largely uneventful film some emotional impact…It's an unpretentious and largely unremarkable film that occasionally reaches unexpected depths of feeling". Variety called it a "beautifully controlled and highly nostalgic picture of childhood".

Legacy 
Derek Malcolm has compared Hou Hsiao-hsien to Satyajit Ray and wrote that the film's honesty and truth "manage[s] to summon up this little microcosm of the world perfectly…Everything is right: the miraculous use of sound, the limpid cinematography, the natural acting create an atmosphere you can't forget". Jonathan Rosenbaum praised its long takes and deep focus cinematography and called it "unhurried family chronicle carries an emotional force and a historical significance that may not be immediately apparent". Geoff Andrew of Time Out wrote that "it is the unflinching, unsentimental honesty that supplies the elegiac intelligence: Hou's quiet style bursts forth, here and there, into sudden, superlative scenes of untrammelled emotional power. It's a brilliantly simple but multi-faceted portrait of loss and the complacency of childhood: quite literally, we can't go home again".

References

External links 
 

1985 films
1980s Mandarin-language films
Taiwanese-language films
Hakka Chinese-language films
Films directed by Hou Hsiao-hsien
1985 drama films
Hakka culture in Taiwan
Central Motion Picture Corporation films
Films with screenplays by Chu T’ien-wen
Taiwanese drama films